Gary Faye Locke (born January 21, 1950) is an American politician, attorney, and former diplomat from the state of Washington. Locke served as the 21st governor of Washington from 1997 to 2005, where he was the first Chinese-American governor as well as the first Asian American governor in the continental U.S. During the Obama administration, Locke served as Secretary of Commerce from 2009 to 2011, and as Ambassador to China from 2011 to 2014, where he was the first Chinese American to serve in the role.

First elected to the Washington House of Representatives in 1982, Locke went on to become King County executive in 1993 before being elected governor in 1996 election. A former prosecutor by professor, Locke staked out a reputation as a moderate Democrat during his tenure. Reelected in the 2000 gubernatorial election, Locke was chosen by national Democrats to give the party's response to president George W. Bush's 2003 State of the Union address. Locke declined to run for reelection in 2004.

Since 2020, Locke has served as interim president of Bellevue College, the largest of the institutions that make up the Washington Community and Technical Colleges system.

Early life and education
Gary Locke was born on January 21, 1950, in Seattle, Washington, and spent his early years living in the Yesler Terrace public housing project. Locke is a third-generation Chinese American with paternal ancestry from Jilong village, Taishan, Guangdong.

Locke is the second of five children of James "Jimmy" (Youh K.) Locke, who served as a staff sergeant in the U.S. Fifth Armored Division during World War II. James Locke's wife, Julie, is from Hong Kong, which at that time was a British Crown Colony. His paternal grandfather left China in the 1890s and moved to the United States, where he worked as a houseboy in Olympia, Washington, in exchange for English lessons. 

Locke's father was born on October 15, 1917, in Taishan, and moved to the United States in 1931. He died on January 5, 2011, at the age of 93. Locke did not learn to speak English until he was five years old and entered kindergarten.

Locke graduated with honors from Seattle's Franklin High School in 1968. He achieved Eagle Scout rank and received the Distinguished Eagle Scout Award from the Boy Scouts of America. Through a combination of part-time jobs, financial aid, and scholarships, Locke attended Yale University, graduating with a Bachelor of Arts in political science in 1972. He received his Juris Doctor from Boston University School of Law in 1975.

State of Washington political career
Locke has spoken of being inspired by Wing Luke (1925 – 1965), a Chinese American attorney and politician from Seattle who died in a plane crash in 1965.

In 1982, Locke was elected from a South Seattle district to the Washington House of Representatives, where he served as the chair of the Appropriations Committee. Eleven years later, in 1993, Locke was elected King County's Executive, defeating incumbent liberal Republican Tim Hill.

Governor of Washington
In 1996, Locke won the Democratic primary and general election for governor of Washington, becoming the first Chinese American governor in United States history. His political committee was fined $2,500 by regulators in 1997 after admitting to state campaign finance law violations.

Locke faced criticism from fellow Democrats for embracing the Republican Party's "no-new-taxes" approach to Washington's budget woes during and after the 2001 economic turmoil. Among his spending-reduction proposals were laying off thousands of state employees; reducing health coverage; freezing most state employees' pay; and cutting funding for nursing homes and programs for the developmentally disabled. 

In his final budget, Locke suspended two voter-passed school initiatives and cut state education funding. Supported by the state's political left, former Washington Supreme Court Justice Phil Talmadge announced his plans to challenge Locke in the 2000 Democratic primary, but Talmadge ended his campaign early for health reasons. Locke went on to win reelection in 2000.

2003 State of the Union response and retirement 
Locke was chosen to give his party's response to George W. Bush's 2003 State of the Union Address. In a surprise move, Locke announced in July 2003 that he would not seek a third term, saying, "Despite my deep love of our state, I want to devote more time to my family." 

Susan Paynter, a columnist at the Seattle Post-Intelligencer, suggested that racist slurs, insults, and threats that Locke and his family received, especially after his rebuttal to Bush's State of the Union address, may have played a role in Locke's decision to leave office after two terms. The governor's office received hundreds of threatening letters and emails; others threatened to kill his children. His official portrait, painted by Michele Rushworth, was unveiled in the state capitol by Governor Christine Gregoire on January 4, 2006.

After leaving office, Locke joined the Seattle office of international law firm Davis Wright Tremaine LLP, in their China and governmental-relations practice groups. During the leadup to the 2008 Democratic presidential primary, Locke was Washington co-chairman of Hillary Clinton's campaign.

National politics 
On the national stage, Democrats saw Locke as a possible vice-presidential choice. In 1997, he was a guest at the State of the Union address. During the 2004 presidential election, Locke was seen as a potential Cabinet choice for Democratic nominee John Kerry. Locke was mentioned as a potential contender for Secretary of Education or United States Trade Representative under a hypothetical Kerry administration.

Secretary of Commerce

On December 4, 2008, the Associated Press reported that Locke was a potential candidate for Secretary of the Interior in then-President-elect Barack Obama's cabinet. Eventually, then-Colorado Senator Ken Salazar was nominated for that position instead.

On February 25, 2009, Locke was announced as Obama's choice for Secretary of Commerce, and his nomination was confirmed by the United States Senate by unanimous consent on March 24. Locke was sworn in March 26 by District Judge Richard A. Jones, and by Obama on May 1. 

Locke was the first Chinese-American Secretary of Commerce, and one of three Asian Americans in Obama's cabinet, joining Secretary of Energy Steven Chu and Secretary of Veterans Affairs Eric Shinseki. Politico reported Locke was a popular cabinet member among both businesses and the executive branch. A declaration of assets made in March 2011 showed Locke to be the sixth-richest official in the U.S. executive branch.

Ambassador to China

Following the resignation of Jon Huntsman Jr., Obama nominated Locke to serve as United States Ambassador to China. The Senate confirmed Locke unanimously on July 27, 2011; Locke resigned as Secretary of Commerce on August 1.

A photo of Locke carrying his own knapsack and ordering his own coffee at the Seattle-Tacoma International Airport went viral in China on the Sina Weibo social network, with many commentators approving of his humble, low-key style. At his first news conference after arrival in Beijing, Locke pledged to promote bilateral cooperation and understanding between the two countries.

Early in Locke's ambassadorship, Chinese dissident Chen Guangcheng escaped from house arrest and sought refuge in the U.S. Embassy in Beijing in April 2012. On May 2, China's Ministry of Foreign Affairs demanded an apology from the U.S. for its role in the incident. In an editorial on May 4, Beijing Daily questioned Locke's motives by taking Chen in, describing Chen as "a tool and a pawn for American politicians to blacken China."

In late November 2013, Locke announced that he would step down as ambassador to spend more time with his family in Seattle. In an analysis of his ambassadorship, Sun Zhe, a professor at Tsinghua University in Beijing, said, "It is not an easy job to be the American ambassador to China. Gary Locke is not a shining star, but a simple and unadorned ambassador." Shen Dingli, dean of the international studies department at Fudan University in Shanghai, largely concurred, commenting that Locke "showed us how a U.S. minister-level official behaves by taking economy-class flights" but "caused a twist" when he allowed Chen refuge in the U.S. embassy. Max Baucus, a former United States Senator from Montana, was Obama's nominee to replace Locke and was confirmed by the Senate 96–0; Vice President Joe Biden administered the oath of office on February 21, 2014.

Post-ambassadorship career 
On February 17, 2016, Locke joined the board of AMC Theatres.

On May 31, 2016, Locke joined the board of the Seattle-based global health nonprofit PATH.

Locke has been a major proponent of affirmative action in Washington State. He publicly endorsed I-1000 in the 2019 Washington State general election. Those efforts were overturned by a majority of voters in the state of Washington in 2019.

In 2020, Locke was featured in a Trump reelection ad, portraying him with Joe Biden and falsely suggesting he was an official of the Chinese Communist Party.

Locke was named the interim president of Bellevue College in May 2020, following the resignation of the college's president due to a controversial defacement of a campus mural.

In March 2021, local media speculated that Locke could run for Mayor of Seattle in the 2021 election. Commentators noted that this was unlikely, as he resided in Bellevue, Washington, outside of Seattle city limits. Locke chose not to run, instead endorsing the campaign of Bruce Harrell, who was elected.

Personal life
Locke's first marriage, to a law school classmate, ended with a divorce in the 1970s. On October 15, 1994, Locke married Mona Lee, a television reporter for the NBC affiliate KING 5 television in Seattle and former Miss Asian America 15 years his junior. They divorced in 2015.
The Lockes have three children: Emily Nicole (b. March 1997), Dylan James (b. March 1999), and Madeline Lee (b. November 2004). He is a Protestant.

Regarding his ethnicity and being the only person of Chinese descent to have served as an ambassador to China, he said, "I’m proud of my Chinese heritage. I’m proud of the great contributions that China has made to world civilization over thousands of years. But I’m thoroughly American. I’m proud of the great values that America has brought to the entire world and all that America stands for."

Political views
When asked if there is place for Asian Americans in politics, Locke had this to say:

"I think our native cultures have emphasized respect for our elders, care of our elders, but also focusing on education. But my overall response is that Asian Americans are part and parcel of the great success of America. Our grandparents came over in the 1800s to work in the railroads, work the lumber camps, goldmines, worked in the canneries, farmland that most people thought could never raise a crop, worked as merchants in cities that were just emerging. They fought in world wars, died for our freedoms and our liberties. Asian Americans have given our blood, sweat and tears to the communities and to this country. There's a prosperity that we on the west coast enjoy. So much of the prosperity and progress of the western states is because of the blood, sweat and tears of Asian Americans. From doing the dirty work to fighting in our world wars and contributing to our society now as doctors, researchers, people in high tech, as innovators, in all different professions. We have every right, indeed a responsibility, to help set the policies that will move our communities and our nation forward."

See also
 History of Chinese Americans in Seattle
 List of minority governors and lieutenant governors in the United States

References

External links

Ambassador Gary Locke
Biography at the United States Department of Commerce

 Gary Locke, "Trends and Challenges of China's Economic and Technology Rise," Keynote Address to China 2.0 Conference, Stanford Graduate School of Business, Oct. 24, 2013. —Video.

Bio of Gary Locke, Washington State Digital Archives

|-

|-

|-

|-

|-

|-

|-

|-

1950 births
Living people
21st-century American politicians
Ambassadors of the United States to China
American people of Hong Kong descent
American state governors of Chinese descent
Asian-American people in Washington (state) politics
American people of Chinese descent
Chinese-American members of the Cabinet of the United States
Boston University School of Law alumni
Democratic Party governors of Washington (state)
Franklin High School (Seattle) alumni
Obama administration cabinet members
Politicians from Seattle
United States Secretaries of Commerce
Yale University alumni
Bellevue College
Democratic Party members of the Washington House of Representatives